Norrmalmstorg is a town square in central Stockholm, Sweden. It connects shopping streets Hamngatan and Biblioteksgatan and is the starting point for tram travellers with the Djurgården line. Close to the southwest is the park Kungsträdgården.

In the Swedish edition of Monopoly, Norrmalmstorg is the most expensive lot.

The square is famous for the 1973 Norrmalmstorg robbery, in which events gave name to the Stockholm syndrome. The building in question is now occupied by the Nobis Hotel Stockholm.

Gallery

See also
Norrmalm (proper)

References

Squares in Stockholm